= Polygamy in Kuwait =

Polygamy is legal in Kuwait. Nearly 8% of all marriages are polygamous. It has been reported that polygamy is on the decline among the younger generation.
